The following is a list of seasons played by B 1908 from the founding of the club in May 1908 up to the most recent season. In 1912, the club joined Amager Boldspil-Union (ABU), joining their league and cup tournaments and later also participated in tournaments organised by the Københavns Forstadsklubbers Boldspil Union (KFBU). In the first 1912-season for seniors arranged by the new football association, Boldklubben 1908 won the regional league championship of Amager by going through the tournament undefeated. Their first competitive league match was played away in April 1912 against Boldklubben Fremad Amager, ending in a 13–0 win, as part of the first match in the official regional championship of Amager.

Key
Key to league competitions:

 Level 1: Danmarksmesterskabsturneringen (1927–1929), Mesterskabsserien (1929–1940), Danmarksturneringen (1940–1945), 1. division (1945–1990), Superligaen (1991–present)
 Level 2: Oprykningsserien (1929–1936), II. Serie (1936–1940), 2. division (1945–1990), Kvalifikationsligaen (1992s, 1993s, 1994s, 1995s), 1. division (1991–present)
 Level 3: III. Serie (1936–1940), 3. division (1945–1990), 2. division (1991–present)
 Level 4: Kvalifikationsturneringen (1959–1965), Danmarksserien for herrer (1966–1995), Kvalifikationsrækken (1996–2000), Danmarksserien for herrer (1966–present)
 Level 5: Danmarksseriens Kvalifikationsrække (2000–2008)
 Level 6 (Level 1 under DBU Copenhagen): KBUs Mesterskabsrække (1920–1936), KBUs A-række (1936–1947), Københavnsserien A / Københavnsserien B (1947–1977), Københavnsserien (1978–present)
 Level 7 (Level 2 under DBU Copenhagen): KBUs A-række (1920–1936), KBUs B-række (1936–1947), KBUs Mellemrække (1947–1984), KBUs Serie 1 (1985–2011), DBU København Serie 1 (2011–present)
 Level 8 (Level 3 under DBU Copenhagen): KBUs Deltagerturnering & KBUs Forstadsturnering (1920–21), KBUs B-række (1921–1936), KBUs C-række (1944–1947), KBUs A-række (1947–1984), KBUs Serie 2 (1985–2011), DBU København Serie 2 (2011–present)

Key to colours and symbols:

Key to league record:
 Season = The year and article of the season
 Position = Final position in table
 Level = Level in the football league system
 P = Games played
 W = Games won
 D = Games drawn
 L = Games lost
 F = Goals scored
 A = Goals against
 Pts = Points

Key to cup record:
 En-dash (–) = Did not participate
 DSQ = Disqualified
 DNE = Did not enter cup play
 QR1 = First qualification round, etc.
 GS = Group stage
 GS2 = Second group stage
 R1 = First round, etc.
 R16 = Round of 16
 QF = Quarter-finals
 SF = Semi-finals
 RU = Runners-up
 W = Winners

Seasons 
Results of league and cup competitions by season.

Footnotes

References

Seasons
Boldklubben 1908